Bleiken Station is located on the Gjøvik Line at Bleiken in Gran, Norway. The railway station was opened on 23 December 1901.

External links 
  Entry at Jernbaneverket <
 Entry at the Norwegian Railway Club 

Railway stations in Oppland
Railway stations on the Gjøvik Line
Railway stations opened in 1901
1901 establishments in Norway
Gran, Norway